The black-faced antbird (Myrmoborus myotherinus) is a species of bird, about 12–13 cm (5 inches) long, in the antbird family Thamnophilidae. It is endemic to a wide range across the Amazon basin. It feeds on insects and spiders and sometimes follows army ants to catch the insects disturbed by their march.

Taxonomy
The black-faced antbird was described and illustrated by the German naturalist Johann Baptist von Spix in 1825 and given the binomial name Thamnophilus myotherinus. The specific epithet is from the Ancient Greek muiothēras meaning "flyhunter".

There are seven subspecies currently recognised, although some of these may represent separate species and others only clinal variation, and more research is needed into the species' taxonomy.

Description
The male of the nominate race is blueish grey above, with the wings and tail slightly darker, a black face, throat and wing tips. The female is duller, mostly olive-brown with black tipped wings and light buff underparts. The different races vary in the darkness of the male and colours and pattern of the female.

Distribution and habitat
The black-faced antbird is found in a wide range of about 4,800,000 km2 across the Amazon basin in Bolivia, Brazil, Colombia, Ecuador, Peru, and Venezuela. Its natural habitat is tropical moist lowland and foothill evergreen forest, generally below 1000 m. It prefers densely vegetated areas in light gaps (such as tree falls) in terra firme forest.

Behaviour

Breeding
The nest of this species was first described in 2003 based on two nests found in Manú National Park, Peru. The domed or oven shaped nests were placed on the ground between thin branches. Each nest had four layers, an inner layer of fine palm fibres, a layer of dry leaves, a structural layer composed of flexible vine stems and an outer layer of dry leaves that made the nest difficult to see. One nest contained a single egg, the other two eggs. The eggs were white with a light dusting of dark purple spots and streaks. Both parents participated in building the nest, incubating the eggs and feeding the nestlings. When the nest was threatened by predators one of the parents gave a broken-wing display in order to distract attention away from the nest.

Food and feeding
The black-faced antbird feeds on insects and spiders, travelling in pairs or small family groups, usually within mixed-species feeding flocks. It progresses deliberately, hopping forward with occasional flaps and then pausing to scan for prey. It will regularly follow swarms of army ants, in order to catch insects flushed by the swarms, but it is not an obligate ant-follower. At swarms it is subordinate to obligate (or professional) ant-followers, but when they are absent it is dominant over other species.

Status
The population size and trends in population numbers have not been determined, but is it believed that the black-faced antbird is not threatened and so the species is evaluated as Least Concern on the IUCN Red List of Threatened Species.

References

External links
Xeno-canto: audio recordings of the Black-faced Antbird

black-faced antbird
Birds of the Amazon Basin
black-faced antbird
Taxonomy articles created by Polbot